Scouting and Guiding in El Salvador'' is served by two groups. Founded in 1944, the 'Girl Guide Association of El Salvador became an associate member of the World Association of Girl Guides and Girl Scouts in 1949 and a full member in 1960. The Asociación de Scouts de El Salvador   was founded in 1938 and became a member of the World Organization of the Scout Movement in 1940.

Background
The Scout and Guide movement in El Salvador''' is served by
 Asociación de Muchachas Guías de El Salvador, member of the World Association of Girl Guides and Girl Scouts
 Asociación de Scouts de El Salvador, member of the World Organization of the Scout Movement

References

External links